Dorothy-Marie Jones (born January 4, 1964) is an American actress and retired athlete who has had multiple roles in television. She attended California State University, Fresno, where she set records for shot put. Jones is also a 15-time world arm wrestling champion. She was a recurring guest star starting in the second season of the musical television series Glee as Coach Beiste, and appeared through the show's sixth and final season, when she was promoted to starring status. She was nominated for the Primetime Emmy Award for Outstanding Guest Actress in a Comedy Series in 2011, 2012, and 2013 for her portrayal of Coach Beiste. She is also known for her roles as Coach Kelly in Lizzie McGuire and Butch Brenda in Material Girls.

Early life
Jones was born January 4, 1964, and was raised in Hilmar, California. She first got involved in strength competitions at a fairly young age. She started track in middle school. While Jones attended Hilmar High School, she was a champion weight lifter and named female athlete of the year. She started arm wrestling on a whim, and won her first arm wrestling world championship at 19 years old and went on to win 14 more.

After graduating from Hilmar High School, Jones attended Modesto Junior College and Fresno State, where she continued her involvement with sports. She earned a scholarship in track which paid her way through junior college and university. Jones played softball and competed in shot put and powerlifting. She won All-America honors in shot put both at junior college and university, was state champion in 1983 and 1984 and set the national record at the junior college level from 1983 to 1990. She finished sixth. After college, Jones worked as a youth counselor at the Fresno County Juvenile Probation center while continuing her involvement with sports.

Acting career
Jones, who originally had no acting aspirations, was discovered at a bodybuilding competition by Shirley Eson of American Gladiators fame. Eson urged Jones to audition for the Gladiators-like Knights and Warriors, and Jones got the part, becoming one of the few female warriors. Jones was also offered a position in professional wrestling, but turned it down because, she said it was "too fakey."

After Knights and Warriors finished after one season she became a bit actor. She played small roles in several television series throughout the 1990s and 2000s and breaking into feature films in the late 1990s, including the cult film The Boondock Saints. While acting, Jones kept up her involvement with arm wrestling. In 1995, her biceps measured .

Jones' first recurring role after Knights was as a character named "Dot" on the popular show Married... with Children in the mid-90s. She appeared in five episodes over two seasons. Jones' next break was on the kids show Lizzie McGuire as Coach Kelly. Since then, she has appeared in popular shows Nip/Tuck, Desperate Housewives, and Prison Break. Dot Jones co-starred with Hilary Duff in Lizzie McGuire. They were later reunited for Material Girls.

Jones, being a fan of Glee and having worked with series co-creator Ryan Murphy on Nip/Tuck and Pretty/Handsome, asked co-executive producer Brad Falchuk during an encounter at a supermarket if she could be on the show. Soon after, the character of Coach Shannon Beiste in Glee was created for her. She guest starred in seasons two, three, four, and five, and was a main cast member for the sixth and final season. The show allowed her to showcase her singing abilities. Her first song was "One Bourbon, One Scotch, One Beer" with Matthew Morrison's character Will Schuester. It was featured on Glee: The Music, The Complete Season Two.  She also recorded versions of Taylor Swift's "Mean" and Dolly Parton's "Jolene". These were included on the album Glee: The Music, The Complete Season Three.

Jones appeared on Logo TV's RuPaul's Drag U as a visiting professor in July 2011, during the second season.

Personal life
Jones married Bridgett Casteen on December 21, 2013. The two first met in December 2010 and Jones proposed on October 4, 2013, during Anaheim Gay Days.

Filmography

Film

Television

References

External links
 
Dot Marie Jones' Official Website

1964 births
20th-century American actresses
21st-century American actresses
Actresses from California
American arm wrestlers
American film actresses
American female shot putters
American television actresses
American lesbian actresses
Lesbian sportswomen
LGBT people from California
American LGBT sportspeople
Living people
People from Merced County, California
Sportspeople from California
Track and field athletes from California
LGBT track and field athletes
LGBT arm wrestlers
21st-century LGBT people